The North-West Frontier States Agency was one of the colonial Agencies of British India exercising indirect rule.

It comprised the Princely States associated with the North-West Frontier Province (now Khyber-Pakhtunkhwa, in Pakistan).

Subagencies were the Dir, Swat and Chitral Agency and the Deputy Commissioner of Hazara acting as the Political Agent for Amb and Phulra.

Princely States
Then the only salute state was :
 Chitral, title Mehtar, enjoying a Hereditary salute of 11-guns

One then non-salute state would later outrank Chitral by Pakistani presidential grant of a Hereditary salute of 15-guns in 1966 :
 Swat, title Wali

The rest remained non-salute states : 
 Amb, title Nawab
 Dir, title Nawab
 Phulra(h), title Nawab

Agencies of British India
History of Khyber Pakhtunkhwa
North-West Frontier Province